Magpas Air Ambulance is an emergency medical charity that provides pre-hospital emergency care, in the air or on land, including treatments normally only available in hospitals. The charity operates 24/7 from its base in Cambridgeshire and is activated to seriously ill or injured patients in Cambridgeshire, Bedfordshire and the East of England – caring for a population of over 10 million. 

The Magpas Air Ambulance medical team combines the skills of a specialist doctor and a critical care paramedic on every shift. They support the NHS ambulance services by providing treatment at the scene of life-threatening emergencies that would otherwise only be available in hospitals. They are dispatched by both the East of England Ambulance Service and East Midlands Ambulance Service.

History
Magpas was founded as the Mid Anglia General Practitioner Accident Service in 1971 by Dr. Neville Silverston and Dr. Derek Cracknell, who responded to road accidents in their own cars.

The origins of the name relate to a close historical and geographical association with Cambridgeshire Constabulary which, until 1974, was known as the Mid-Anglia Constabulary. The service was originally provided by general practitioners from across the mid-Anglia area that was activated by the police and ambulance services to attend to serious accidents and provide on-scene care. Magpas provided the training, equipment, and governance framework. The organisation became a registered charity in 1972. The charity has been known as Magpas Air Ambulance since acquiring its own helicopter in 2013.

Within the first five years that Magpas was operational the road accident fatality rate in mid-Anglia fell by 36%.

In 1977, Magpas contributed to the foundation of the British Association for Immediate Care (BASICS) to raise and maintain the standards of care given by doctors responding to medical emergencies. Today BASICS is a recognised authority on pre-hospital immediate care and Magpas remains a member. As NHS paramedics developed so did the charity. It undertook detailed research into its effectiveness and reviewed the way it operated.

In 1997, the charity entered a new partnership with Cambridgeshire Constabulary to use the police helicopter for the deployment of medical staff and patient transport.[1]

In 1999, Magpas Air Ambulance became the first service in the region to provide a night-time helicopter emergency medical service.

In 2007, the East Anglian Air Ambulance agreed to provide a helicopter, dubbed Anglia Two, to be based out of RAF Wyton for daytime missions. Although this was withdrawn in 2010, Magpas Air Ambulance went back to providing the whole service, in conjunction with the police.

From 2000 until 2010, the charity developed a network of community first responder schemes across Cambridgeshire and Bedfordshire.  These local volunteers were trained by Magpas and then responded to medical emergencies such as chest pain and breathing difficulties in their local area.  Their role was to treat the patient until the ambulance service arrived. In 2010, the Magpas Air Ambulance first responders were joined with other schemes under the leadership of the East of England Ambulance Trust.

In 2010, East Anglian Air Ambulance announced plans for their helicopter service which would no longer rely on Magpas volunteers. In 2012, Magpas Air Ambulance began flying with its own helicopter, having paid to use a police helicopter for the preceding fifteen years.

The charity was heavily involved in the creation of Pre-Hospital Emergency Medicine (PHEM), a sub-specialty of emergency medicine and anaesthesia recognised by the General Medical Council. Doctors train with Magpas in giving people facing serious medical emergencies lifesaving procedures and treatments that are not normally available outside of a hospital

Magpas was registered with the Healthcare Commission, and was inspected by the Care Quality Commission in March 2014. This looks at the governance and quality assurance of the care provided to ensure it meets national standards.

In October 2015, Magpas Air Ambulance announced it would provide a 24-hour service for emergency medical care and advice, although the helicopter is not available at all times. By doing so, it became the first air ambulance charity in the East of England region to offer round-the-clock care.

Research

In partnership with the University Hospital of Leicester, Magpas Air Ambulance runs CTARP (the Cambridge Trauma and Audit Research Project). This project looks to identify lessons from all cases of traumatic injury occurring in Cambridgeshire.  This can then be used to improve the quality of care and examine ways to prevent incidents in the first place.

Facts and figures 
 In the year ending June 2021, the charity reported an income of £5.6million, which included £380,000 of government grants. Expenditure was £4.8M, of which £3.7M was spent on operating the air ambulance service.
 In 2021, the charity employed 60 people and had 40 volunteers.

See also 
Air ambulances in the United Kingdom

References

External links 

 

Official LinkedIn 

Air ambulance services in England
Health charities in the United Kingdom
Charities based in England
Charities based in Cambridgeshire
Health in Cambridgeshire